Gonzalo Alemán Migliolo (born 10 May 1954) is a Mexican politician affiliated with the Institutional Revolutionary Party. He served as Deputy of the LIX Legislature of the Mexican Congress representing Tamaulipas, and previously served as municipal president of Aldama from 1978 to 1980.

References

1945 births
Living people
Politicians from Tamaulipas
Municipal presidents in Tamaulipas
Institutional Revolutionary Party politicians
Autonomous University of Tamaulipas alumni
20th-century Mexican politicians
21st-century Mexican politicians
Deputies of the LIX Legislature of Mexico
Members of the Chamber of Deputies (Mexico) for Tamaulipas